The canton of La Motte-Servolex is an administrative division of the Savoie department, southeastern France. Its borders were modified at the French canton reorganisation which came into effect in March 2015. Its seat is in La Motte-Servolex.

It consists of the following communes:

Bourdeau 
Le Bourget-du-Lac
La Chapelle-du-Mont-du-Chat
Drumettaz-Clarafond
Méry
La Motte-Servolex
Viviers-du-Lac
Voglans

References

Cantons of Savoie